Aurora Springs is an unincorporated community and census-designated place in northern Miller County, in the U.S. state of Missouri. The community is located on Saline Creek, just south of Eldon and west of U.S. Route 54.

Demographics

History
Aurora Springs was platted in 1880, and named for a mineral spring near the original town site.  A post office called Aurora Springs was established in 1882, and remained in operation until 1912.

References

Unincorporated communities in Miller County, Missouri
Unincorporated communities in Missouri